Mikael Arne Johansson (born June 12, 1966 in Huddinge, Sweden) is a Swedish retired professional ice hockey player and coach.

Career
Johansson started his career at Huddinge IK, but moved to Djurgårdens IF in 1985. Johansson and his team won the Swedish championship in 1989, 1990 and 1991. He was drafted by Quebec Nordiques in the seventh round of the 1991 NHL Entry Draft, 134th overall. Johansson moved to EHC Kloten of the Swiss National League A in 1992 and won four Swiss championships before moving back to Sweden and Djurgården again in 1997. He has since his stay at EHC Kloten been included in the club's Hall of Fame and his number has been retired. Djurgården and Johansson won two more Swedish Championships in 2000 and 2001. He retired from professional hockey in 2005. Johansson's number 25 was retired in Djurgården on February 15, 2007. Johansson is the younger brother of fellow hockey player and head coach Kent Johansson. He was assistant coach for Djurgårdens IF from 2008 to 2012, but he was fired along with head coach Hardy Nilsson in January 2012.

Career statistics

Regular season and playoffs

International

References

External links

1966 births
Living people
Djurgårdens IF Hockey players
Huddinge IK players
Ice hockey players at the 1988 Winter Olympics
Ice hockey players at the 1992 Winter Olympics
EHC Kloten players
Olympic bronze medalists for Sweden
Olympic ice hockey players of Sweden
Olympic medalists in ice hockey
Quebec Nordiques draft picks
Ice hockey people from Stockholm
Swedish ice hockey coaches
Swedish ice hockey centres
Swedish expatriate ice hockey players in Germany
Djurgårdens IF Hockey coaches